Rich Riley (born August 17, 1973) is an American businessman and entrepreneur. Currently, he is co-CEO of Origin Materials, a chemicals and materials company. He was formerly the Chief Executive Officer of Shazam. He was an executive at Yahoo! from 1999 to 2013.

Early life and education 
Riley grew up in Austin, Texas, and attended Westlake High School. He earned a Bachelor of Science in economics with concentrations in finance and entrepreneurial management from the Wharton School of the University of Pennsylvania.

Career

Log-Me-On.com 
Riley was co-founder and managing member of Log-Me-On.com when he was 25. The company developed and patented what is today the Yahoo! Toolbar; Yahoo! bought Log-Me-On in 1999.

Yahoo! 

After the sale of Log-Me-On, Riley started at Yahoo! as a manager in Corporate Development and became a director of Business Development, senior vice president of the Small & Medium Business Division, managing director and senior vice president of the EMEA Region, and finally executive vice president of the Americas, during which he reported to the CEO and was a member of Yahoo’s Executive Management team.

Shazam 

In 2013, Riley became CEO of Shazam, replacing Andrew Fisher, who now serves as Executive Chairman. Shazam was acquired by Apple in 2017. Riley is an executive producer of the Fox TV series Beat Shazam, based on the app and hosted by Jamie Foxx, also an executive producer.

Origin Materials 

Riley is currently co-CEO of Origin Materials, a chemicals and materials company.

Recognition 
 In October 2011, Riley was listed in Fortunes "40 under 40: Ones to Watch".
 Riley has been included in the Billboard 2015, 2016 and 2017 Power 100 lists.
 Riley won the distinguished alumni award from Westlake High School.

Personal life 
Riley serves on the Wharton School Entrepreneurial Advisory Board and is a member of the Young Presidents' Organization. He is married to Michelle Leone Riley; in 2005 he and his wife established a scholarship to assist a needy undergraduate attending the University of Pennsylvania. They live in New Canaan, Connecticut, and have four children.

References 

Living people
Wharton School of the University of Pennsylvania alumni
Westlake High School (Texas) alumni
Yahoo! employees
1973 births